The August 1880 Liverpool by-election was held on 6 August 1880 after the incumbent Liberal MP, John Ramsay became the Earl of Dalhousie and could no longer sit in the House of Commons.  The seat was gained by the Conservative candidate Lord Claud Hamilton.

References

1880 elections in the United Kingdom
Walton, 1882
1880 in England
1880s in Liverpool
August 1880 events